There are at least 28 named lakes and reservoirs in Dawson County, Montana.

Lakes

Reservoirs
 Bailer Reservoir, el. 
 Big Drop Reservoir, el. 
 Camp Reservoir, el. 
 Circle Reservoir, el. 
 Crisafulli Lake, el. 
 Deer Creek Reservoir, el. 
 Forks Reservoir, el. 
 Gagena Reservoir, el. 
 Hollecker Lake, el. 
 Hollecker Reservoir, el. 
 Jack Downs Reservoir, el. 
 Johnson Reservoir, el. 
 Keeland Reservoir, el. 
 Lindsay Reservoir, el. 
 Longs Reservoir, el. 
 Malkuch Reservoir, el. 
 Malkuch Reservoir, el. 
 Milliron Reservoir Number 1, el. 
 Milliron Reservoir Number 2, el. 
 Prairie Goat Reservoir, el. 
 Roy Richey Reservoir, el. 
 Senner Reservoir, el. 
 Twin Forks Reservoir, el. 
 Twin Forks Reservoir, el. 
 Upper Labell Reservoir, el. 
 Upper Magpie Reservoir, el. 
 Wold Reservoir, el. 
 Wolff Reservoir, el.

See also
 List of lakes in Montana

Notes

Bodies of water of Dawson County, Montana
Dawson